Denton Hill State Park is a  Pennsylvania state park in Ulysses Township, Potter County, Pennsylvania, in the United States. The park is a downhill skiing resort. Denton Hill State Park is on U.S. Route 6 between Coudersport and Galeton. In 2000 the park became part of the Hills Creek State Park complex, an administrative grouping of eight state parks in Potter and Tioga counties.

Recreation
Denton Hill State Park was the first ski operation run by the Pennsylvania Department of Forests and Waters (a predecessor to the Pennsylvania Department of Conservation and Natural Resources). The park was established in 1951, opened in 1959, and the lodge and ski area were built between 1958 and 1967. The ski area was operated by the state until 1979, when it became a concession run by a private contractor ("Ski Denton" as of 2011). The park was closed to downhill skiing in late 2014, when the concession contract expired. The state has completed a study on what improvements to the park facilities would be needed to fully re-open the park.

The skiing ranged from easy, beginner slopes to some of the most dangerous, expert, black diamond slopes on the east coast of the United States. There are four ski lifts at the park, each of which stops at a different elevation on the slopes. Lift-accessed Snow tubing is also available at Denton Hill State Park, or Ski Denton.

There are five chalets on the grounds of Ski Denton. Each cabin has wall to wall carpeting and two bedrooms that sleep up to six individuals. There is a large living room with a cathedral ceiling in each cabin. The cabins also have a full kitchen, dining room, and bathroom. A hostel style bunkhouse sits atop the main lodge.

Ski Denton opens its slopes and trails for mountain bikers in the off season; when the lifts were running, bikers could use those to get to the top of the slopes. Part of the Susquehannock Trail System, an  loop hiking trail, forms the southern border of the park.

Nearby state parks
The following state parks are within  of Denton Hill State Park:
Bucktail State Park Natural Area (Cameron and Clinton Counties)
Cherry Springs State Park (Potter County)
Colton Point State Park (Tioga County)
Hyner Run State Park (Clinton County)
Hyner View State Park (Clinton County)
Kettle Creek State Park (Clinton County)
Leonard Harrison State Park (Tioga County)
Lyman Run State Park (Potter County)
Patterson State Park (Potter County)
Prouty Place State Park (Potter County)
Sinnemahoning State Park (Cameron and Potter Counties)
Sizerville State Park (Cameron and Potter Counties)

References

State parks of Pennsylvania
Protected areas established in 1951
Parks in Potter County, Pennsylvania
1951 establishments in Pennsylvania
Protected areas of Potter County, Pennsylvania